A bánh bèo  is a Vietnamese dish that is originated from Hu%E1%BA%BF, a city in Central Vietnam. The English translation for this dish is water fern cakes. Bánh bèo is made from a combination of rice flour and tapioca flour. It is popular street food in Vietnam. The ingredients include rice cake, dried shrimps, crispy pork skin, scallion oil, and dipping sauce. It is usually eaten as a snack but is now considered a dish in restaurants and can be eaten as lunch and dinner.

Methods of eating Banh Beo 
Banh beo is usually accompanied by nuoc mam (a clear sauce made from sugar, fish sauce, garlic, and Thai chili) and crunchy pork belly strips that enhance the taste of the dish. 

Like most dishes, there are various versions of banh beo around Vietnam. For example, banh beo from Quang Ngai is topped with a combination of shrimp and pork paste instead. Banh beo from the South side of Vietnam is eaten with mashed mung bean as topping, making it sweeter than the banh beo from Hue or Quang Ngai because that was how Southerners in Vietnam prefer it.  

Most often, banh beo are served in individual small dishes and eaten whole after scraping out of the dish with a spoon. Another way to eat this dish is to use a chopstick to nudge the banh beo off the circular dish. 

It is often paired with beverages such as green or black tea, or Vietnamese iced coffee. It is best eaten when fresh to avoid the dish being spoiled.

Etymology
The dish's name is believed to derive from the fact that it is shaped like a duckweed (bèo in Vietnamese). Bánh is a Vietnamese term translating loosely as "cake."

In modern Vietnamese culture, bánh bèo is slang for girls who are portrayed as overly feminine, weak-willed, and high maintenance (because of its soft, rubbery texture).

See also
 Chwee kueh 
 Bánh
 List of steamed foods

References

Vietnamese rice dishes
Culture in Huế
Steamed foods